Sriwijaya Air crash could refer to

Sriwijaya Air Flight 62, which crashed in August 2008
Sriwijaya Air Flight 182, which crashed in January 2021